Dichelacera alcicornis is a species of horse flies in the family Tabanidae.

Distribution
This species is present in Brazil (Minas Gerais to Santa Catarina) and Argentina (Mendoza).

References 

Tabanidae
Insects described in 1828
Diptera of South America
Taxa named by Christian Rudolph Wilhelm Wiedemann